Dundas station was a passenger station in Dundas, Ontario, Canada. It was located halfway up the Niagara Escarpment west of downtown Dundas, near where Hamilton Regional Road 8 (formerly Ontario Highway 8) crosses under the railway tracks.

History

The Great Western Railway (GWR) put their line through Dundas in 1853, but it wasn't until 1864 that the first station was built. They algamated with the Grand Trunk Railway (GTR) in 1882, who constructed a new station building in 1904 and double tracked the line. The GTR was absorbed by the Canadian National Railway (CNR) in 1923. Via Rail continued to provide passenger train service to the station from 1977 until the mid 1980s. A fire seriously damaged the station in 1984 and it was decided to move the historic structure to a more suitable site. The building collapsed while it was being dismantled and it could not be saved. The VIA/Amtrak International continued to stop until it was rerouted in 1990. A restricted fire access route from Highway 8 is the only reminder of a railway station in the area.

References

External links

Dundas' Grand Trunk Station
Dundas Train Crash, Christmas 1934

Grand Trunk Railway stations in Ontario
Railway stations in Hamilton, Ontario
Demolished buildings and structures in Ontario
Railway stations in Canada opened in 1864
Former Amtrak stations in Canada